The 1964 Houston Cougars football team was an American football team that represented the University of Houston as an independent during the 1964 NCAA University Division football season. In its third season under head coach Bill Yeoman, the team compiled a 2–6–1 record. Horst Paul was the team captain. The team played its home games at Rice Stadium (five games) and Robertson Stadium (one game) in Houston.

Schedule

References

Houston
Houston Cougars football seasons
Houston Cougars football